Line 1 of the Wuxi Metro is a rapid transit line running from north to south Wuxi, China. It was opened on 1 July 2014. The line is 34.6 km long with 27 stations.

Opening timeline

Stations (north to south)

References

1
2014 establishments in China
Railway lines opened in 2014